Terry Im (born May 13, 1989), better known by his stage name KRNFX (stylised krNfx; also pronounced "Korean FX"), is a Korean-Canadian beatboxer and singer. He is perhaps best known for his participation in the first season of Canada's Got Talent in 2012, as well as winning the first Canadian Beatbox Championships in 2010 and his YouTube videos.

Early life
Born in Toronto to South Korean parents, some of Im's first memories of beatboxing were of him mimicking his father's piano playing and singing. It was from that point that his parents decided to nurture his joy for music and his hunger to create music. As he got older and through his parents encouragement, he learned to play the piano, the flute and the drums. He began beatboxing while he was learning to play the drums in Grade 7, and whenever he wasn't drumming he was inclined to mimic the sounds he made while drumming with his mouth. Beatboxing became a hobby for the young Im, and later on he decided to pursue a career in the art.

Career
KRNFX began his beatboxing career in 2007 at the South Korean Beatbox Championship in Seoul, where he finished the competition in first place. He then went on to win the Kollaboration event in Toronto the following year, and retained his South Korean crown in 2009.

In 2010, KRNFX competed in the Toronto Beatbox Championships and later the Canadian Beatbox Championships, both in which he finished in first place. Later in the year, he was invited to compete in the Emperor of Mic Beatbox Battle in Graz, Austria, but lost out to Spanish beatboxer Lytos in the quarter finals.

The following year, KRNFX entered the Grand Beatbox Battle in Basel, Switzerland, where he again finished in second place, and finished third in the 2011 Emperor of Mic Beatbox Battle. He returned to winning ways later in the year when he won the Red Bull Academy Culture of Clash event in Toronto, and followed up with a second consecutive Canadian Beatbox Championships title. He rose to fame in Canada when he auditioned for the first season of Canada's Got Talent in Toronto. During his performance, judges Stephan Moccio, Measha Brueggergosman and Martin Short stood up and began dancing to KRNFX's beatboxing along with the rest of the audience, and after his performance he received a standing ovation from the entire crowd. Moccio called the beatboxer "amazing", and host Dina Pugliese described the audience as the "loudest it's ever been" on the show.

In 2012, the beatboxer entered the next Grand Beatbox Battle in Basel, where he finished one place lower than the previous year, and finished in the top 16 at the Beatbox Battle World Championship in Berlin, Germany. During the course of the year, KRNFX also progressed through Canada's Got Talent and made it all the way to the finals, where he and 11 others lost to traditional dance trio Sagkeeng's Finest from Fort Alexander, Manitoba.

In 2013, KRNFX's recognition rose further, collaborating with American dancer Mike Song to make an appearance on The Ellen DeGeneres Show in March, and performing live with him at the Red Bull BC One Championships in Seoul, South Korea in December, both in which the duo performed their routine entitled "The Dancebox", in which Song dances in sync with KRNFX's beatboxing.

In 2014, KRNFX made his first appearance as a guest rapper in the online series Epic Rap Battles of History, portraying Grant Imahara in the Season 4 premiere "Ghostbusters vs. Mythbusters". He returned to the series in 2015, portraying Lao Tzu in the Season 4 episode "Eastern Philosophers vs. Western Philosophers".

KRNFX also collaborated on Walk off the Earth's cover of Taylor Swift's "I Knew You Were Trouble" in 2013 and on the same band's cover of Adele's "Hello" in 2016 .

In November 2016, KSTYLE TV uploaded the first video of KRNFX's collaborative beatboxing series, Betbaks, and released a cover of Korean girl group Blackpink's "Whistle" with singer-songwriter Megan Lee. The next Betbaks video published by KSTYLE TV was a cover of BTS' "Blood Sweat & Tears", featuring Korean-American musical composer and choreographer for YG Entertainment, Lydia Paek. For KRNFX's next video in the series, he collaborated with Justin Park, a fresh new R&B artist from 5A LABEL in Los Angeles, and the video was published on December 26, 2016. Subsequently, on January 10, 2017, his cover of Twice's "TT", another collaboration with Lydia Paek was uploaded. Following the success of Korean girl group I.O.I, he then collaborated with Choi Yoo-jung and Kim Do-yeon on a cover "Very Very Very", and the video was posted on April 25, 2017.

In 2020, KRNFX made his guest appearance in the American children's television show Ryan's Mystery Playdate.

Performance in competitions

References

External links
 

1989 births
Living people
Canadian musicians of Korean descent
Canadian people of South Korean descent
Canadian beatboxers
Musicians from Toronto
Canada's Got Talent contestants